Puerto Rico Highway 251 (PR-251)  is a road located in Culebra, Puerto Rico.

Route description
Formerly known as PR-999, this road begins in front of Benjamín Rivera Noriega Airport, at its intersection with PR-250, and runs in a northwest direction in front of the Clark and Ensenada Extension communities, reaching Flamenco Beach and Laguna Flamenco. It provides indirect access to Tamarindo Beach, Flamenco Bay and Punta Molinos in the Fraile and San Isidro neighborhoods.

Major intersections

See also

 List of highways numbered 251

References

External links
 

251
Culebra, Puerto Rico